Tillandsia elongata is a species of flowering plant in the genus Tillandsia. It is native to Central America, Yucatán, Jamaica, Trinidad, and northern South America (Colombia, Venezuela including the Venezuelan Antilles, Guyana, northern Brazil).

References

elongata
Flora of South America
Flora of Central America
Flora of Jamaica
Flora of Trinidad and Tobago
Flora of Yucatán
Plants described in 1816
Epiphytes
Flora without expected TNC conservation status